List of business schools in Switzerland. Public schools on the list are all accredited higher education institution (AAQ), part of Universities in Switzerland. Private business schools are not accredited higher education institutions but they are able to legitimately carry out their activities in Switzerland by virtue of the principle of economic freedom. They may also use a name that is not subject to an accreditation requirement. However, this does not mean that the Swiss authorities recognise the studies offered, nor the examinations passed nor the qualifications issued.

Public business schools

Private business schools 

Klubschule Migros

See Also
 Diploma mills
 Accreditation mill
 Educational accreditation
 List of unaccredited institutions of higher learning
 List of unrecognized accreditation associations of higher learning
 Unaccredited institutions of higher learning
 Résumé fraud

References 

 https://www.ge.ch/en/authorizations-open-and-operate-private-schools
Switzerland
Education in Switzerland